INT may refer to:
 abbreviation for interjection
 Telecom & Management SudParis, formerly Institut National des Télécommunications (INT), a French higher education institute
 Telecom SudParis, formerly Telecom INT, a French grande ecole, graduate school for engineers
 Telecom Business School, formerly INT Management, a French Grande Ecole, graduate business school
 Smith Reynolds Airport, Winston-Salem, North Carolina
 The Israel National Trail, a hiking trail that crosses Israel
 The Indian National Theatre, a theatre organisation and troupe based in Mumbai, India
 an interception in American football statistics
 The Interstate Railroad, A former US railroad.
 Int Base, the headquarters of the Church of Scientology

Mathematics and science

 int(S) means the interior of set S
 \int, the LaTeX command that produces integral symbols
 INT (chemical), a synthetic dye
 Isaac Newton Telescope, an optical telescope in the Canary Islands

Computing
 int, short for integer in many programming languages
 shorthand for interrupt
 INT (x86 instruction), an assembly language instruction for the x86 architecture for generating a software interrupt
 abbreviation for internationalization
 .int, a generic top-level domain (gTLD)
 INT - Interactive software development environment. Often a segregated computer network used for testing current and future software releases.

Popular culture
 The Intelligence statistic in Dungeons & Dragons and similar games
 The /int/ international board on 4chan.